Hahncappsia cochisensis is a moth in the family Crambidae. It was described by Hahn William Capps in 1967. It is found in North America, where it has been recorded from Arizona and western Texas.

The wingspan is 21–26 mm for males and 19–26 mm for females. Adults have been recorded on wing from June to September.

References

Moths described in 1967
Pyraustinae